The 2012–13 Charlotte Bobcats season was the 23rd season of NBA basketball in Charlotte, and their ninth as the Charlotte Bobcats. Charlotte finished the season on a three-game winning streak, and the team's 21–61 record was enough to finish fourth in the Southeast division for the eighth time in nine seasons. The Bobcats tripled their win total from the prior lockout-shortened season, and showed signs of improvement.

Key dates
 June 28, 2012: The 2012 NBA Draft took place at the Prudential Center in Newark, New Jersey.
 November 10, 2012: This day marks the first time in Charlotte Bobcats history that they defeated the Dallas Mavericks.

Draft picks

Roster

Pre-season

|-bgcolor=#cfc
| 1
| October 7
| Washington
| 
| Gerald Henderson Jr. (19)
| Byron Mullens (8)
| Ramon Sessions (5)
| Time Warner Cable Arena6,213
| 1–0
|-bgcolor=#fcc
| 2
| October 9
| @ New Orleans
| 
| Ben Gordon (15)
| DeSagana Diop (8)
| Ramon Sessions (6)
| New Orleans Arena9,264
| 1–1
|-bgcolor=#fcc
| 3
| October 11
| New Orleans
| 
| Ben Gordon,Byron Mullens (15)
| Brendan Haywood,Byron Mullens (5)
| Gerald Henderson Jr.,Ramon Sessions (4)
| Time Warner Cable Arena6,596
| 1–2
|-bgcolor=#fcc
| 4
| October 16
| @ Oklahoma City
| 
| Ben Gordon (21)
| Bismack Biyombo (6)
| Ramon Sessions (7)
| Chesapeake Energy Arena18,203
| 1–3
|-bgcolor=#fcc
| 5
| October 20
| @ Detroit
| 
| Kemba Walker (15)
| Tyrus Thomas (16)
| Ramon Sessions (6)
| The Palace of Auburn Hills9,923
| 1–4
|-bgcolor=#fcc
| 6
| October 23
| Miami
| 
| Ramon Sessions,Kemba Walker (24)
| Kemba Walker (6)
| Gerald Henderson Jr.,Kemba Walker (4)
| PNC Arena17,924
| 1–5
|-bgcolor=#fcc
| 7
| October 25
| Milwaukee
| 
| Kemba Walker (20)
| Brendan Haywood (13)
| Kemba Walker (7)
| Time Warner Cable Arena19,077
| 1–6
|-bgcolor=#fcc
| 8
| October 26
| @ Dallas
| 
| Gerald Henderson Jr. (17)
| Byron Mullens (19)
| Ramon Sessions (4)
| American Airlines Center19,239
| 1–7

Regular season

Game log

|-style="background:#cfc;"
| 1 || November 2 || Indiana
| 
| Kemba Walker (30)
| Brendan Haywood (9)
| Ramon Sessions (4)
| Time Warner Cable Arena19,124
| 1–0
|-style="background:#fcc;"
| 2 || November 3 || @ Dallas
| 
| Ramon Sessions (22)
| Brendan Haywood (11)
| Sessions & Walker (5)
| American Airlines Center19,490
| 1–1
|-style="background:#fcc;"
| 3 || November 7 || Phoenix
| 
| Byron Mullens (24)
| Kidd-Gilchrist & Mullens (8)
| Ramon Sessions (9)
| Time Warner Cable Arena13,905
| 1–2
|-style="background:#fcc;"
| 4 || November 9 || @ New Orleans
| 
| Ben Gordon (34)
| Bismack Biyombo (13)
| Kemba Walker (6)
| New Orleans Arena12,668
| 1–3
|-style="background:#cfc;"
| 5 || November 10 || Dallas
| 
| Kemba Walker (26)
| Byron Mullens (14)
| Kemba Walker (7)
| Time Warner Cable Arena15,763
| 2–3
|-style="background:#cfc;"
| 6 || November 13 || Washington
| 
| Ramon Sessions (21)
| Brendan Haywood (11)
| Mullens & Taylor (4)
| Time Warner Cable Arena11,139
| 3–3
|-style="background:#cfc;"
| 7 || November 14 || @ Minnesota
| 
| Kemba Walker (22)
| Byron Mullens (15)
| Kemba Walker (5)
| Target Center13,272
| 4–3
|-style="background:#fcc;"
| 8 || November 17 || Memphis
| 
| Byron Mullens (18)
| Byron Mullens (9)
| Kemba Walker (8)
| Time Warner Cable Arena16,541
| 4–4
|-style="background:#cfc;"
| 9 || November 19 || Milwaukee
| 
| Ramon Sessions (23)
| Brendan Haywood (11)
| Kidd-Gilchrist, Sessions,Taylor & Walker (4)
| Time Warner Cable Arena11,248
| 5–4
|-style="background:#cfc;"
| 10 || November 21 || Toronto
| 
| Kemba Walker (19)
| Biyombo & Mullens (8)
| Kemba Walker (7)
| Time Warner Cable Arena15,240
| 6–4
|-style="background:#fcc;"
| 11 || November 23 || Atlanta
| 
| Ramon Sessions (22)
| Byron Mullens (8)
| Kemba Walker (9)
| Time Warner Cable Arena17,868
| 6–5
|-style="background:#cfc;"
| 12 || November 24 || @ Washington
| 
| Byron Mullens (8)
| Kidd-Gilchrist & Mullens (8)
| Kemba Walker (8)
| Verizon Center13,077
| 7–5
|-style="background:#fcc;"
| 13 || November 26 || @ Oklahoma City
| 
| Jeffery Taylor (10)
| DeSagana Diop (9)
| Cory Higgins (3)
| Chesapeake Energy Arena18,203
| 7–6
|-style="background:#fcc;"
| 14 || November 28 || @ Atlanta
| 
| Ben Gordon (26)
| Brendan Haywood (11)
| Ramon Sessions (8)
| Philips Arena10,162
| 7–7
|-style="background:#fcc;"
| 15 || November 30 || Philadelphia
| 
| Ben Gordon (19)
| Michael Kidd-Gilchrist (8)
| Kemba Walker (9)
| Time Warner Cable Arena13,202
| 7–8

|-style="background:#fcc;"
| 16 || December 3 || Portland
| 
| Ben Gordon (29)
| Byron Mullens (12)
| Ramon Sessions (9)
| Time Warner Cable Arena12,640
| 7–9
|-style="background:#fcc;"
| 17 || December 5 || New York
| 
| Kemba Walker (25)
| Bismack Biyombo (12)
| Kemba Walker (11)
| Time Warner Cable Arena18,097
| 7–10
|-style="background:#fcc;"
| 18 || December 7 || @ Milwaukee
| 
| Gerald Henderson Jr. (19)
| Michael Kidd-Gilchrist (11)
| Kemba Walker (6)
| BMO Harris Bradley Center13,371
| 7–11
|-style="background:#fcc;"
| 19 || December 8 || San Antonio
| 
| Kemba Walker (23)
| Bismack Biyombo (8)
| Michael Kidd-Gilchrist (6)
| Time Warner Cable Arena17,321
| 7–12
|-style="background:#fcc;"
| 20 || December 10 || Golden State
| 
| Kemba Walker (24)
| Bismack Biyombo (11)
| Sessions & Walker (24)
| Time Warner Cable Arena13,169
| 7–13
|-style="background:#fcc;"
| 21 || December 12 || L.A. Clippers
| 
| Byron Mullens (19)
| Bismack Biyombo (9)
| Kemba Walker (6)
| Time Warner Cable Arena16,786
| 7–14
|-style="background:#fcc;"
| 22 || December 13 || @ Atlanta
| 
| Gerald Henderson Jr. (17)
| Biyombo & Kidd-Gilchrist (6)
| Kemba Walker (6)
| Philips Arena13,090
| 7–15
|-style="background:#fcc;"
| 23 || December 15 || Orlando
| 
| Kemba Walker (32)
| Bismack Biyombo (9)
| Kemba Walker (7)
| Time Warner Cable Arena16,217
| 7–16
|-style="background:#fcc;"
| 24 || December 18 || @ L.A. Lakers
| 
| Kemba Walker (28)
| Byron Mullens (17)
| Kemba Walker (7)
| Staples Center18,997
| 7–17
|-style="background:#fcc;"
| 25 || December 19 || @ Phoenix
| 
| Kemba Walker (27)
| Michael Kidd-Gilchrist (12)
| Kemba Walker (6)
| US Airways Center13,308
| 7–18
|-style="background:#fcc;"
| 26 || December 21 || @ Golden State
| 
| Gerald Henderson Jr. (23)
| Bismack Biyombo (14)
| Kemba Walker (6)
| Oracle Arena19,596
| 7–19
|-style="background:#fcc;"
| 27 || December 22 || @ Denver
| 
| Ramon Sessions (23)
| Byron Mullens (14)
| Mullens & Walker (4)
| Pepsi Center17,555
| 7–20
|-style="background:#fcc;"
| 28 || December 26 || Miami
| 
| Kemba Walker (27)
| Bismack Biyombo (10)
| Kemba Walker (6)
| Time Warner Cable Arena19,602
| 7–21
|-style="background:#fcc;"
| 29 || December 28 || @ Brooklyn
| 
| Hakim Warrick (13)
| Brendan Haywood (8)
| Gerald Henderson Jr. (4)
| Barclays Center17,732
| 7–22
|-style="background:#fcc;"
| 30 || December 29 || New Orleans
| 
| Michael Kidd-Gilchrist (22)
| Hakim Warrick (10)
| Kemba Walker (9)
| Time Warner Cable Arena18,110
| 7–23
|-style="background:#cfc;"
| 31 || December 31 || @ Chicago
| 
| Kemba Walker (18)
| Bismack Biyombo (11)
| Kemba Walker (6)
| United Center21,986
| 8–23

|-bgcolor="ffcccc"
| 32 || January 4 || Cleveland
| 
| Ben Gordon (27)
| Michael Kidd-Gilchrist (9)
| Ramon Sessions (6)
| Time Warner Cable Arena15,576
| 8–24
|-style="background:#cfc;"
| 33 || January 6 || @ Detroit
| 
| Kemba Walker (20)
| Bismack Biyombo (17)
| Kemba Walker (7)
| The Palace of Auburn Hills11,963
| 9–24
|-style="background:#fcc;"
| 34 || January 9 || Utah
| 
| Ben Gordon (20)
| Kidd-Gilchrist & Warrick (8)
| Kemba Walker (6)
| Time Warner Cable Arena13,347
| 9–25
|-style="background:#fcc;"
| 35 || January 11 || @ Toronto
| 
| Gordon, Kidd-Gilchrist& Walker (12)
| Jeff Adrien (9)
| Sessions & Williams (3)
| Air Canada Centre14,373
| 9–26
|-style="background:#fcc;"
| 36 || January 12 || @ Indiana
| 
| Ben Gordon (21)
| Michael Kidd-Gilchrist (8)
| Ramon Sessions (6)
| Bankers Life Fieldhouse13,656
| 9–27
|-style="background:#fcc;"
| 37 || January 14 || @ Boston
| 
| Sessions & Warrick (16)
| Michael Kidd-Gilchrist (8)
| Kemba Walker (4)
| TD Garden18,624
| 9–28
|-style="background:#fcc;"
| 38 || January 15 || Indiana
| 
| Gerald Henderson Jr. (15)
| Adrien & Biyombo (6)
| Gerald Henderson Jr. (3)
| Time Warner Cable Arena12,996
| 9–29
|-style="background:#cfc;"
| 39 || January 18 || @ Orlando
| 
| Kemba Walker (25)
| Kemba Walker (8)
| Ramon Sessions (7)
| Amway Center17,598
| 10–29
|-style="background:#fcc;"
| 40 || January 19 || Sacramento
| 
| Ramon Sessions (16)
| Brendan Haywood (7)
| Kemba Walker (10)
| Time Warner Cable Arena17,012
| 10–30
|-style="background:#fcc;"
| 41 || January 21 || Houston
| 
| Kemba Walker (35)
| Bismack Biyombo (9)
| Kemba Walker (5)
| Time Warner Cable Arena16,108
| 10–31
|-style="background:#fcc;"
| 42 || January 23 || Atlanta
| 
| Ramon Sessions (27)
| Bismack Biyombo (10)
| Sessions & Walker (5)
| Time Warner Cable Arena12,534
| 10–32
|-style="background:#cfc;"
| 43 || January 26 || Minnesota
| 
| Kemba Walker (25)
| Bismack Biyombo (13)
| Kemba Walker (8)
| Time Warner Cable Arena15,397
| 11–32
|-style="background:#fcc;"
| 44 || January 28 || @ Chicago
| 
| Gordon & Walker (18)
| Jeff Adrien (10)
| Kemba Walker (6)
| United Center21,308
| 11–33
|-style="background:#fcc;"
| 45 || January 30 || @ San Antonio
| 
| Ramon Sessions (20)
| Adrien & Walker (6)
| Taylor & Walker (4)
| AT&T Center18,581
| 11–34

|-style="background:#fcc;"
| 46 || February 2 || @ Houston
| 
| Kemba Walker (24)
| Jeff Adrien (7)
| Ramon Sessions (6)
| Toyota Center15,494
| 11–35
|-style="background:#fcc;"
| 47 || February 4 || @ Miami
| 
| Ramon Sessions (18)
| Biyombo & Mullens (9)
| Ben Gordon (4)
| American Airlines Arena19,600
| 11–36
|-style="background:#fcc;"
| 48 || February 6 || @ Cleveland
| 
| Byron Mullens (15)
| Bismack Biyombo (8)
| Kemba Walker (4)
| Quicken Loans Arena13,264
| 11–37
|-style="background:#fcc;"
| 49 || February 8 || L.A. Lakers
| 
| Henderson & Mullens (20)
| Byron Mullens (12)
| Kemba Walker (8)
| Time Warner Cable Arena19,624
| 11–38
|-style="background:#fcc;"
| 50 || February 9 || @ Philadelphia
| 
| Ramon Sessions (20)
| Biyombo & Haywood (7)
| Sessions & Walker (4)
| Wells Fargo Center15,048
| 11–39
|-style="background:#cfc;"
| 51 || February 11 || Boston
| 
| Byron Mullens (25)
| Byron Mullens (18)
| Kemba Walker (6)
| Time Warner Cable Arena15,709
| 12–39
|-style="background:#fcc;"
| 52 || February 13 || @ Indiana
| 
| Byron Mullens (19)
| Bismack Biyombo (16)
| Kemba Walker (6)
| Bankers Life Fieldhouse11,707
| 12–40
|-align="center"
|colspan="9" bgcolor="#bbcaff"|All-Star Break
|-style="background:#cfc;"
| 53 || February 19 || @ Orlando
| 
| Henderson & Walker (24)
| Byron Mullens (12)
| Kemba Walker (7)
| Amway Center17,037
| 13–40
|-style="background:#fcc;"
| 54 || February 20 || Detroit
| 
| Kemba Walker (24)
| Bismack Biyombo (8)
| Ramon Sessions (8)
| Time Warner Cable Arena13,112
| 13–41
|-style="background:#fcc;"
| 55 || February 22 || Chicago
| 
| Kemba Walker (27)
| Bismack Biyombo (12)
| Byron Mullens (3)
| Time Warner Cable Arena17,870
| 13–42
|-style="background:#fcc;"
| 56 || February 23 || Denver
| 
| Kemba Walker (24)
| Bismack Biyombo (9)
| Kemba Walker (5)
| Time Warner Cable Arena18,481
| 13–43
|-style="background:#fcc;"
| 57 || February 26 || @ L.A. Clippers
| 
| Gerald Henderson Jr. (24)
| Byron Mullens (8)
| Kemba Walker (5)
| Staples Center19,060
| 13-44

|-style="background:#fcc;"
| 58 || March 1 || @ Utah
| 
| Byron Mullens (12)
| Byron Mullens (7)
| Kemba Walker (7)
| EnergySolutions Arena17,691
| 13–45
|-style="background:#fcc;"
| 59 || March 3 || @ Sacramento
| 
| Byron Mullens (12)
| Michael Kidd-Gilchrist (6)
| Kemba Walker (6)
| Power Balance Pavilion14,555
| 13-46
|-style="background:#fcc;"
| 60 || March 4 || @ Portland
| 
| Ramon Sessions (18)
| Michael Kidd-Gilchrist (10)
| Kemba Walker (11)
| Rose Garden18,330
| 13–47
|-style="background:#fcc;"
| 61 || March 6 || Brooklyn
| 
| Michael Kidd-Gilchrist (17)
| Josh McRoberts (6)
| Kemba Walker (8)
| Time Warner Cable Arena13,382
| 13–48
|-style="background:#fcc;"
| 62 || March 8 || Oklahoma City
| 
| Gerald Henderson Jr. (21)
| Jeff Adrien (6)
| Gerald Henderson Jr. (5)
| Time Warner Cable Arena18,870
| 13–49
|-style="background:#fcc;"
| 63 || March 9 || @ Washington
| 
| Kemba Walker (29)
| Bismack Biyombo (7)
| Kemba Walker (6)
| Verizon Center16,357
| 13–50
|-style="background:#cfc;"
| 64 || March 12 || Boston
| 
| Gerald Henderson Jr. (35)
| Josh McRoberts (10)
| Kemba Walker (4)
| Time Warner Cable Arena15,006
| 14–50
|-style="background:#fcc;"
| 65 || March 15 || @ Toronto
| 
| Gerald Henderson Jr. (22)
| Josh McRoberts (9)
| Kemba Walker (4)
| Air Canada Centre17,514
| 14–51
|-style="background:#fcc;"
| 66 || March 16 || @ Boston
| 
| Jannero Pargo (18)
| Josh McRoberts (10)
| Gerald Henderson Jr. (4)
| TD Garden18,624
| 14–52
|-style="background:#cfc;"
| 67 || March 18 || Washington
| 
| Gerald Henderson Jr. (27)
| Michael Kidd-Gilchrist (7)
| Gerald Henderson Jr. (8)
| Time Warner Cable Arena10,141
| 15–52
|-style="background:#cfc;"
| 68 || March 20 || Toronto
| 
| Byron Mullens (25)
| Josh McRoberts (12)
| Kemba Walker (8)
| Time Warner Cable Arena12,872
| 16–52
|-style="background:#fcc;"
| 69 || March 23 || Detroit
| 
| Kemba Walker (25)
| Bismack Biyombo (10)
| Kemba Walker  Jannero Pargo (3)
| Time Warner Cable Arena16,375
| 16–53
|-style="background:#fcc;"
| 70 || March 24 || @ Miami
| 
| Kemba Walker (20)
| Bismack Biyombo (11)
| Kemba Walker (3)
| American Airlines Arena20,350
| 16–54
|-style="background:#cfc;"
| 71 || March 27 || Orlando
| 
| Gerald Henderson Jr. (34)
| Josh McRoberts (8)
| Kemba Walker (9)
| Time Warner Cable Arena11,839
| 17–54
|-style="background:#fcc;"
| 72 || March 29 || @ New York
| 
| Gerald Henderson Jr. (35)
| Bismack Biyombo (9)
| Kemba Walker (8)
| Madison Square Garden19,033
| 17–55
|-style="background:#fcc;"
| 73 || March 30 || @ Philadelphia
| 
| Michael Kidd-Gilchrist (21)
| Michael Kidd-Gilchrist (9)
| Kemba Walker (9)
| Wells Fargo Center16,764
| 17–56

|-style="background:#fcc;"
| 74 || April 1 || @ Milwaukee
| 
| Kemba Walker (27)
| Josh McRoberts (10)
| Kemba Walker (6)
| BMO Harris Bradley Center15,315
| 17–57
|-style="background:#cfc;"
| 75 || April 3 || Philadelphia
| 
| Gerald Henderson Jr. (24)
| Josh McRoberts (16)
| Kemba Walker (10)
| Time Warner Cable Arena13,097
| 18–57
|-style="background:#fcc;"
| 76 || April 5 || Miami
| 
| Michael Kidd-Gilchrist (18)
| Michael Kidd-Gilchrist (14)
| Kemba Walker (4)
| Time Warner Cable Arena19,568
| 18–58
|-style="background:#fcc;"
| 77 || April 6 || @ Brooklyn
| 
| Ben Gordon (27)
| Bismack Biyombo (10)
| Gerald Henderson Jr. (5)
| Barclays Center17,444
| 18–59
|-style="background:#fcc;"
| 78 || April 9 || @ Memphis
| 
| Kemba Walker (19)
| Bismack Biyombo (12)
| Kemba Walker (3)
| FedExForum16,591
| 18–60
|-style="background:#fcc;"
| 79 || April 12 || @ Detroit
| 
| Kemba Walker (28)
| Bismack Biyombo (8)
| Kemba Walker (6)
| The Palace of Auburn Hills19,501
| 18–61
|-style="background:#cfc;"
| 80 || April 13 || Milwaukee
| 
| Kemba Walker (21)
| Bismack Biyombo (17)
| Josh McRoberts (9)
| Time Warner Cable Arena14,680
| 19–61
|-style="background:#cfc;"
| 81 || April 15 || New York
| 
| Gerald Henderson Jr. (27)
| Bismack Biyombo (11)
| Kemba Walker (13)
| Time Warner Cable Arena15,238
| 20–61
|-style="background:#cfc;"
| 82 || April 17 || Cleveland
| 
| Kemba Walker (24)
| Kidd-Gilchrist & McRoberts (8)
| Kemba Walker (7)
| Time Warner Cable Arena13,487
| 21-61

Standings

Transactions

Overview

Trades

Free agents

See also
 List of 2012–13 NBA season transactions
 List of Charlotte Hornets seasons

References

Charlotte Bobcats seasons
Charlotte Bobcats
Bob
Bob